The Harris-Holden House is a historic house on a former plantation in Lincoln County, Tennessee. It was built in 1860 for Joel M. Harris, a planter and slaveholder. During the American Civil War of 1861–1865, the Union Army looked for victuals in the house. In 1901, Harris took to sheep farming, but dogs ate his herd. Harris died in 1914, and the remaining slave cabins on the property were demolished in 1920. By the 1970s, the house belonged to the Holden family. It has been listed on the National Register of Historic Places since March 19, 1975.

References

Houses on the National Register of Historic Places in Tennessee
National Register of Historic Places in Lincoln County, Tennessee
Houses completed in 1860
Plantation houses in Tennessee